Laxminarayan Sharma (L.N. Sharma) ( 5 September 1933 - 17 October 2008) was an Indian politician from Bharatiya Janata Party and was a member of the Parliament of India representing Madhya Pradesh in the Rajya Sabha, the upper house of the Indian Parliament. He was a former cabinet minister of the Madhya Pradesh Legislative Assembly. He began his legislative career in 1967 and was an MLA for 35 years.

Laxminarayan Sharma was a visionary leader and played a significant role in the development of Madhya Pradesh specially in the agriculture sector and always strived for the upliftment of the rural communities. He is well known for his heroic efforts and fearless relief work during the 1984 Bhopal disaster.

He joined the Rashtriya Swayamsevak Sangh at a young age and was a teacher by profession in a government school in Madhya Pradesh. He had penned many poems during his political career.

Shri L.N Sharma died on 17 October 2008 in New Delhi due to a heart attack at the age of 75. His last rites were performed with full state honors in Bhopal.

Early life and education 
Laxminarayan Sharma was born to a Hindu family in Village Karondiya, Dist. Bhopal and belonged to the Brahmin community. His family and parents were involved in farming and agricultural activities. He was a teacher in school and had completed B.Ed., M.A. He was also a gold medalist in LL.B. from Vikram University, Ujjain (Madhya Pradesh). He is survived by his wife Smt. Laxmidevi Sharma and they have three sons and two daughters.

Political career 
L.N Sharma was first elected to the Madhya Pradesh Legislative Assembly in 1967 from the Bharatiya Jana Sangh. He was one of the only few members of the Bharatiya Jana Sangh from Bhopal. He was a Government Teacher before he entered active politics. His roles in the opposition had kept the government on the toes. He was consecutively elected seven times to the  Madhya Pradesh Legislative Assembly from 1967 to 1993. He began his political career with Jana Sangh which merged with Janata Party in 1977. Sharma was detained for 19 months during The Emergency under the Maintenance of Internal Security Act (MISA).

He had later represented the Bharatiya Janata Party and held various important minister portfolios and was a senior Cabinet Minister. Sharma was known for his straight forward approach and fearless attitude. He played a major role in establishing and expanding the early footprints of Bharatiya Janata Party in Bhopal constituency and Madhya Pradesh. He had left his home constituency and moved to different constituencies in order to expand the party's reach and establish a strong cadre.

He was Minister of Revenue, Cooperative, Agriculture and Irrigation during his time at Madhya Pradesh Legislative Assembly in various terms. In 2004 he was elected as Member of Parliament, Rajya Sabha from Madhya Pradesh.

While Sharma was a sitting member of parliament he succumbed to his cardiac arrest in 2008. Narendra Singh Tomar was then nominated on the vacant seat thereafter.

Positions held 
Sharma contested from various seats of Bhopal and built a stronghold in the city during the initial days of Bharatiya Janata Party. He also held many portfolios during his tenure of Cabinet Minister.

 1967-1972 MLA from Berasia, Bhopal
 1972-1977 MLA from Huzur, Bhopal
 1977-1980 MLA from Govindpura, Bhopal
1980-1985 MLA from Berasia, Bhopal
1985-1990 MLA from Berasia, Bhopal
1990-1993 MLA from Berasia, Bhopal
1993-1998 MLA from Berasia, Bhopal
 2004-2006 Member of Parliament, Rajya Sabha, Madhya Pradesh

References

External links
 Profile on Rajya Sabha website

1933 births
Bharatiya Janata Party politicians from Madhya Pradesh
Rajya Sabha members from Madhya Pradesh
2008 deaths
Madhya Pradesh MLAs 1967–1972
State cabinet ministers of Madhya Pradesh
Janata Party politicians
Bharatiya Jana Sangh politicians